IX is the ninth studio album by the American heavy metal band Corrosion of Conformity, released on July 1, 2014, by Candlelight Records.

Track listing

Personnel
 Mike Dean – bass, vocals, engineer, mixing
 Reed Mullin – drums, vocals
 Woody Weatherman – guitar, vocals
 Pepper Keenan – additional writing on "Tarquinius Superbus"
 Brad Boatright – mastering
 John Custer – mixing

References

Corrosion of Conformity albums
2014 albums